"Mad Season" is a song by American rock band Matchbox Twenty, released as the third single from their second album, Mad Season (2000), on April 2, 2001. The song peaked at number 48 on the US Billboard Hot 100 and reached the top 50 in Australia and New Zealand. In the United Kingdom, it peaked at number 76 on the UK Singles Chart.

Background and writing
Rob Thomas told Billboard magazine that the song took a more universal tone but was originally about "the wild ride that the band has been on since success hit. The whole idea came from out mad season," he says. "It has nothing to do with being bad, it's just crazy. There are no handbooks for any of this."

Music video
The song's music video, directed by Phil Harder, shows the band getting off a plane, surrounded by screaming fans trying to grab them. They are wearing what appear to be special passes, which say "Rock Star" on them, around their necks. Police are there trying to keep everything under control. The band eventually make it safely into their limousine, but then the crowd climbs all over the car, and it cannot go anywhere. The police fail to keep things under control, and the fans break the windows of the limousine. When they get inside, they rip the "Rock Star" passes off the band members, and then leave. This suggests that they did not really care about the band; they just wanted the passes.

Track listings
 US promo CD
 "Mad Season" (edit) – 4:28
 "Mad Season" (album version) – 5:11

 UK and European CD single
 "Mad Season"
 "Long Day" (live)
 "Back 2 Good" (live)

 Australian CD single
 "Mad Season" (album version)
 "If You're Gone" (album version)
 "Long Day" (live)

Charts

Weekly charts

Year-end charts

Release history

References

2000 songs
2001 singles
Atlantic Records singles
Lava Records singles
Matchbox Twenty songs
Music videos directed by Phil Harder
Song recordings produced by Matt Serletic
Songs written by Rob Thomas (musician)